Jorge Costa (born 1971) is a Portuguese football manager and former player. 

Jorge Costa or Jorge da Costa may also refer to:

Jorge Costa (racewalker) (born 1961), Portuguese race walker
Jorge Nuno Pinto da Costa (born 1937), Portuguese businessman
Jorge da Costa (1406–1508), Portuguese cardinal
Jorjão (footballer), full name Jorge Alberto da Costa Silva (born 1970), Brazilian footballer